Rugulosuvines are bio-active alkaloids made by Penicillium, that belongs to a class of naturally occurring 2,5-diketopiperazines.

Notes

References

Diketopiperazines
Penicillium